The White-line Dart (Euxoa nigrofusca) is a moth of the family Noctuidae. It is found from Europe, to southern Siberia, central Asia to the Pacific Ocean. In North Africa it is known from Morocco and Algeria.

Description
The wingspan is 28–40 mm. Colouring and pattern are extremely variable and hardly a specimen has an identical colouring and pattern. The colour varies from grey-brown to dark grey. The costa is pale and the pattern often obscure. Pale orbicular and reniform. The males have relatively short combed antennae, the female antennae are thread-like. Note that E. nigrofusca may not be a good species. The Euxoa tritici complex consists of five sibling species in Europe: White-linedart Euxoa tritici (Linnaeus, 1761), Euxoa nigrofusca (Esper, 1788), Euxoa eruta (Hübner, 1817), Euxoa diaphora Boursin, 1928 and Euxoa segnilis (Duponchel, 1836). Furthermore, although Fibiger (1997) treated Euxoa montivaga differently  it belongs to the E. tritici complex. Differences among the species are subtle, the most important diagnostic characteristics being genitalic. In studies of three of these species, E. tritici, E. nigrofusca and E. eruta, no support was found for the presence of several morphologically distinguishable species with quantitative morphometric analyses.

Life-cycle
The egg is yellowish, without superficial ribs.The caterpillars are yellowish to ochre-colored with a light line on the dorsum and dark laterodorsal lines, which are slightly edged downwards. The lateral stripes are greenish-brown.The pupa is brown-yellow and has a blunt cremaster studded with two pointed thorns.
Overwinters as an egg laid on the foodplant, the larvae feed at night partly subterraneous on the roots of Poaceae and a wide range of herbaceous plants such as corn spurrey (Spergula arvensis). This moth flies from June to October depending on the location and there is one generation per year. It can be found on heaths, sand dunes, cliffs and open heaty woodland.

References

External links
Funet Taxonomy 
Fauna Europaea
Vlindernet 
Lepidoptera of Belgium
White-line Dart at UKmoths
 Noctuinae of Israel

Euxoa
Moths described in 1761
Moths of Africa
Moths of Asia
Moths of Europe
Moths of the Middle East
Taxa named by Carl Linnaeus